Simon Ntamwana (born 3 June 1946) has been the Roman Catholic archbishop of the Archdiocese of Gitega in Burundi since 1997. Ntamwana was ordained as a priest on 24 March 1974 and from 1988 to 1997 he was the bishop of the diocese in Bujumbura. In 1997 he succeeded Joachim Ruhuna as the archbishop of Gitega.

In 2009, he defended Pope Benedict XVI over a controversy on the refusal to give any kind of approval to condoms in the fight against AIDS.

External links

Metropolitan Archdiocese of Gitega, Burundi

1946 births
Living people
Burundian Roman Catholic archbishops
20th-century Roman Catholic archbishops in Africa
21st-century Roman Catholic archbishops in Africa
20th-century Roman Catholic bishops in Burundi
Roman Catholic archbishops of Gitega
Roman Catholic bishops of Bujumbura